K.R.I.T. Wuz Here is the sixth mixtape by American rapper Big K.R.I.T. It was released on May 4, 2010. The mixtape features guest appearances from Curren$y, Wiz Khalifa, Devin the Dude, Big Sant and Smoke DZA.

Track listing
All songs written and composed by Big K.R.I.T.

References

 

2010 mixtape albums
Big K.R.I.T. albums
Hip hop albums by American artists
Albums produced by Big K.R.I.T.